Mary Sauer-Vincent (born October 31, 1975, in Green Bay, Wisconsin) is an American pole vaulter.

Achievements

External links

1975 births
American female pole vaulters
Living people
Sportspeople from Green Bay, Wisconsin